The 2006 Women's European Water Polo Championship was the eleventh edition of the now tri-annual event, organised by the Europe's governing body in aquatics, the Ligue Européenne de Natation. The event took place in the Banjica Sports Center in Belgrade, Serbia from September 2 to September 9, 2006.

There were two qualification tournaments ahead of the event, held from April 7 to April 9, 2006 in Nancy, France (with France, Germany, Great Britain and the Netherlands competing) and in Madrid, Spain (Czech Republic, Greece, Spain and Ukraine).

Qualification

Teams

Group A
 

 
 

Group B

Squads

Preliminary round

Group A

Saturday September 2, 2006 

Sunday September 3, 2006 

Monday September 4, 2006

Group B

Saturday September 2, 2006 

Sunday September 3, 2006 

Monday September 4, 2006

Quarterfinals
Wednesday September 6, 2006

Semifinals
Thursday September 7, 2006

Finals
Wednesday September 6, 2006 — Seventh place

Thursday September 7, 2006 — Fifth place

Saturday September 9, 2006 — Bronze Medal

Saturday September 9, 2006 — Gold Medal

Final ranking

Individual awards
Most Valuable Player

Best Goalkeeper

Topscorer
 — 18 goals

References
 LEN Results

Women
2006
International water polo competitions hosted by Serbia
E
W
W
2000s in Belgrade
September 2006 sports events in Europe
Sports competitions in Belgrade